Lena: A New Album is a 1976 studio album by Lena Horne, arranged by Robert Farnon.

Track listing
 "I've Grown Accustomed to His Face" (Alan Jay Lerner, Frederick Loewe) – 3:55
 "Someone to Watch Over Me" (George Gershwin, Ira Gershwin) – 4:30
 "My Funny Valentine" (Lorenz Hart, Richard Rodgers) – 3:39
 "Some Day My Prince Will Come" (Frank Churchill, Larry Morey) – 4:18
 "I've Got the World on a String" (Harold Arlen, Ted Koehler) – 5:33
 "Softly, as I Leave You" (Hal Shaper, Antonio DeVito, Giorgio Calabrese) – 3:48
 "I Have Dreamed" (Oscar Hammerstein II, Rodgers) – 4:46
 "A Flower Is a Lovesome Thing" (Billy Strayhorn) – 3:18
 "I've Got to Have You" (Kris Kristofferson) – 3:52
 "My Ship" (I. Gershwin, Kurt Weill) – 5:20

Personnel

Performance
Lena Horne – vocals
Chris Laurence - double bass
David Snell - harp
Gordon Beck - keyboards
Phil Woods - saxophone
Raymond Cohen - violin
Robert Farnon – arranger, conductor, orchestration
Lennie Hayton - arranger

Production
Dick Heckstall-Smith - art direction
Acy Lehman
Arlene Chapman - assistant producer
Sherman Sneed - assistant
Keith Grant - engineer, digital editing, editing, mixing, technical supervisor
Nat Shapiro - executive producer
David Ades - liner notes
Nat Peck - orchestra assembly
Richard Avedon - photography
Norman Schwartz - producer

References

1976 albums
Lena Horne albums
Albums arranged by Robert Farnon
Albums arranged by Lennie Hayton
Albums produced by Nat Shapiro
RCA Records albums